CYP8B1 (cytochrome P450, family 8, subfamily B, polypeptide 1) also known as sterol 12-alpha-hydroxylase is a protein which in humans is encoded by the CYP8B1 gene.

This gene encodes a member of the cytochrome P450 superfamily of enzymes. The cytochrome P450 proteins are monooxygenases which catalyze many reactions involved in drug metabolism and synthesis of cholesterol, steroids and other lipids.

CYP8B1 is an endoplasmic reticulum membrane protein and catalyzes the conversion of 7 alpha-hydroxy-4-cholesten-3-one into 7-alpha,12-alpha-dihydroxy-4-cholesten-3-one. The balance between these two steroids determines the relative amounts of the two primary bile acids, cholic acid and chenodeoxycholic acid, both of which are secreted in the bile. In the intestine these bile acids affect the solubility of cholesterol and other lipids, promoting their absorption. 

CYP8B1 is unique among the cytochrome P450 genes in that it is intronless.

The elephant, manatee and naked mole rat have inactive copies of this gene and lack cholic acid in their bile. Relaxed selection resulting from changes in diet to consume less lipids might have contributed to the loss of this gene in several species.

References

Further reading